Christoph Heinrich Kniep (1755–1825), was a German painter. He is renowned for accompanying Goethe in his Italian Journey to Naples, Paestum and Sicily, executing several drawings whilst there.

Initially, he worked as a portrait artist, then in 1781 he traveled to Italy, where he painted primarily vistas and landscapes. He met Goethe in Naples, being introduced to him by a mutual friend, the artist Johann Heinrich Wilhelm Tischbein. After separating from Goethe on his return from Sicily, Kniep remained in Naples, where he died in 1825.

Kniep's drawings of Paestum and Pompeii are of extraordinary detail, and have also been used as archaeological documents.

Notes

References
 Georg Striehl, Der Zeichner Christoph Heinrich Kniep (1755–1825). Landschaftsauffassung und Antikenrezeption, Hildesheim, 1998.
 Joseph Eduard Wessely, Kniep, Christoph Heinrich, in Allgemeine Deutsche Biographie, Band 16, Duncker & Humblot, Leipzig 1882, S. 288.

External links

 Auszüge aus Georg Striehl: Der Zeichner Christoph Heinrich Kniep
 

1755 births
1825 deaths
18th-century German painters
18th-century German male artists
German male painters
19th-century German painters
19th-century German male artists